GWM or gwm may refer to:

 Great Wall Motor, a Chinese privately owned automobile manufacturer
 GWM, the Indian Railways station code for Gannavaram railway station, Andhra Pradesh, India
 gwm, the ISO 639-3 code for Awngthim language, Queensland, Australia